Philip Schelfhaut (born 1850 in Sint-Niklaas) was a Belgian clergyman and bishop for the Roman Catholic Diocese of Roseau. He was ordained in 1878. He was appointed bishop in 1902. He died in 1921.

References 

1850 births
1921 deaths
Belgian Roman Catholic bishops
People from Sint-Niklaas
Roman Catholic bishops of Roseau